Julian Prochnow (born 1 July 1986 in Berlin) is a German footballer who plays for SV Babelsberg 03.

References

External links 
 

1986 births
Living people
Footballers from Berlin
German footballers
Association football midfielders
3. Liga players
SV Babelsberg 03 players